JDS Mirai (DDH-182) is a fictional helicopter defense destroyer of the Japan Maritime Self-Defense Force (JMSDF), created for the Japanese manga and anime series Zipang.  The central point of the plot of the anime is that the modern warship Mirai is transported back sixty years through time to 1942 on the eve of the Battle of Midway.  The ship's weapons alone are enough to change the course of World War II, but equally potent are the advanced technology and knowledge of future events on board.  The name of the ship is a homophone for the Japanese word meaning "future" and is often the basis of double entendres in the anime.  The phrase "Mirai no nipponjin" (みらいの日本人), often repeated in the anime, for example, can mean "Japanese people of the ship Mirai" or "Japanese people of the future."

Class description

The Mirai is a ship of a fictional Yukinami-class of helicopter defense destroyer, which was created specifically for the story. The fictional ships are essentially an improved version of the actual Japan Maritime Self-Defense Force . All these ships are equipped with the Aegis Combat System that provides the vessels possessing it the capability to locate, track and target a large number of enemy vessels, aircraft and even missiles at ranges and with accuracy that was unimaginable in World War II.

The JDS Mirai is sometimes described as a cruiser rather than a destroyer. Some sources have picked up this misidentification and reported it as factual.

Variations between the Yukinami-class and the Kongō-class
The major difference between the Yukinami-class and the Kongō-class is that the fictional ship is ten meters longer, which provides space for an aircraft hangar on the aft part of the ship.  Real destroyers of the Kongō class have a helicopter landing pad on the fantail but do not carry any aircraft on board. The hangar on the Mirai allows her to carry a SH-60J Seahawk helicopter and a (fictional) VTOL armed reconnaissance aircraft, the tilt-wing MVSA-32J Umidori (Seagull).  The availability of aircraft, especially the advanced capabilities of the VTOL Umidori, greatly expands the story lines by giving the characters mobility beyond the confines of the ship.

The Mirai and the Atago-class
The JMSDF has produced an improved Kongō class which has a helicopter hangar but still does not carry helicopters on board.  The first of the new destroyers, named Atago, was launched in 2005. The Atago-class design is approximately four meters longer and 500 tons heavier than that of the Kongō class, closely resembling the Mirai’s alterations. However, since the manga Zipang was published in 2000, at the same time as or even before JMSDF had added the improved Kongō’s to their 5-year budget and years before the first keel was laid, it is unlikely that the Mirai was intended to be an Atago-class ship; the resemblance is more likely coincidence resulting from similar operational requirements.  An improved "Flight IIA" version of the American Arleigh Burke-class also includes a slightly lengthened hull and a hangar for two Seahawk helicopters.

Armament

Tomahawk missiles
The characters specifically identified this as the anti-ship variant and it is visually identical to the Tomahawk missile. In real-life, JMSDF ships do not carry Tomahawk cruise missiles, as Article 9 of the Japanese Constitution forbids Japan from possessing offensive weapons of any kind. The use of the Tomahawk cruise missile in the story suggests that in the near-future universe of the JDS Mirai, Japan had changed its policy on offensive weapons. The missile explodes on the deck of the Wasp and causes a massive chain reaction from the aircraft fuel and munitions of the second wave parked on the deck waiting to be launched, the Tomahawk sinks the Wasp with heavy casualties.

MVSA-32J Umidori
The MVSA-32J Umidori (English: Seagull) is a fictional aircraft created for the series. In it, it is a twin turboshaft engine, multi-mission Japan Maritime Self-Defense Force VTOL tilt-wing armed reconnaissance aircraft deployed aboard the destroyer Mirai.

The MVSA-32J has two large, five-bladed propellers mounted on nacelles in its wings.  The wings both tilt, for vertical take-off and landing (VTOL), and fold, for storage within the Mirai’s hangar.  It appears that its engines are not in the wing nacelles, which are too small and do not have any air intakes.  Air intakes and engine exhausts in the lower part of the fuselage indicate that the engines are located there, presumably connected to the propellers by some complicated mechanical linkage.

The design of the Umidori appears to be influenced by the Canadair CL-84 Dynavert Tiltwing, which was intended for projected Sea Control Ships of the 1970s The modern design of the Umidori incorporates features of the Bell XV-15 in terms of aerodynamic form and size, and in turn of the later, larger V-22 Osprey.

Early in the series the Umidori launches to verify that it was in fact 1942, where it flies over a Japanese base and is spotted. It is engaged by two floatplane fighters launched by the base, due to the officers stationed there (obviously) not recognizing the advanced VTOL aircraft. The Umidori pilots manage to disable the floatplanes without killing their operators and escape, but not before the Umidori gunner is struck and killed.

Top speed: 
Armament: one 3-barreled 20mm "Gatling-style" cannon
Crew: 2, a pilot and a weapon systems operator (WSO)

In the series, the Mirais crew refer to the aircraft as the "Seagull" but the characters from 1942 call it the "Umidori".

Deck gun
The main deck gun at the bow of the Mirai was enough to sink American convoy ships; however, it was never used for this purpose. When the Mirai stopped to resupply, the Japanese thought that the Mirai was not a powerful warship, they probably didn't know that the Mirai had missiles as well. The deck gun is a 127 mm compact gun, the standard of modern-day warships. In the episode when Hutton rams his Dauntless against the bridge his left wing, which separated on impact slammed against the deck gun barrel, thus damaging it. When an American Avenger torpedo bomber squadron attacked the Mirai, the deck gun destroyed the entire squadron, even though it was referred to as "one lousy gun". During their later resupply and repair at contemporary Yokosuka, the proper specifications of the original 127 mm were not followed, and thus the replacement barrel was limited to less power and a slower burst. The dire story continues and the new barrel is used in battle, against the bridges and towers of several American warships.

Sea Sparrow
The Mirai carries RIM-7 Sea Sparrow missiles, after a fleet of Japanese warships, led by the mighty Japanese battleship Yamato began heavy shelling of Guadalcanal, which was not to happen according to history, the Mirai launched Sea Sparrows to intercept the 18.1" rounds of Yamato. After intercepting numerous attempts to hit Guadalcanal the crew realized that they had a limited supply and Yamato had a whole magazine full of 18.1" rounds, and so they threatened to fire a missile at Yamato. When USS Wasp found the Mirai, the American carrier launched many aircraft to destroy the advanced warship. The Mirai fired off several missiles to destroy a fraction of the total to try and frighten away the remaining. However they only continued attacking the advanced ship which forced the Mirai to tear apart the first wave with her weapons.

CIWS
The Mirai is armed with several close-in weapon systems (CIWS); these were used several times during the story, one of these times was to tear apart and finally explode an American Douglas SBD Dauntless when its pilot attempted to ram his aircraft in an almost Kamikaze-style move (he bailed out at the last second). These were also used to explode a bomb, CIWS are computer controlled and – according to the anime – have what is called "double A Auto mode."

ASROC
The Mirai uses ASROCs as an anti-submarine weapon; this was used at least once against what appears to be a Gato-class submarine sent to hunt down what the Americans thought was a damaged IJN cruiser, but was in fact a JMSDF guided-missile destroyer. One crewman in the CIC, who was obviously worried and scared by instinct launched the ASROC without clearance from Masayuki. By firing this weapon, the U.S. submarine discovered the Mirais most powerful weapon: the missile. But because Masayuki did not want to sink the submarine and kill its crew, he self-destructed the ASROC a few meters away from the sub.

See also 
 List of fictional ships
 JDS Ise is a real JMSDF ship with the designation DDH-182

References

External links
 JDS Mirai at KODANSHA site (Japanese)
 JDS Mirai at KODANSHA site (Google translated to English)

Fictional ships of the Japan Maritime Self-Defense Force